"Vadelmavene" is a Finnish-language song by Finnish pop singer Kasmir. It was released in Finland as the lead single from his upcoming debut studio album on 4 April 2014, by Universal Music. The song debuted at number 7 on the Finnish Singles Chart on the week 16 of 2014 and topped the chart on week 22.

Charts

See also
List of number-one singles of 2014 (Finland)

References

External links
 

2014 songs
Finnish-language songs
Finnish pop songs
Number-one singles in Finland